Yateya Kambepera (born 2 May 1993) is a Botswana sprinter.

He won the 100 metres and 200 metres at the Botswana National Championships at University of Botswana Stadium on 21 April 2012. In the 100, he beat previous record holder Obakeng Ngwigwa to set a new national record, with 10.36 seconds.

References

External links

1993 births
Living people
People from North-West District (Botswana)
Botswana male sprinters
Athletes (track and field) at the 2019 African Games
African Games competitors for Botswana